József Sándor Éles (15 June 1936 – 10 September 2002), sometimes credited simply as Sándor Éles, was a Hungarian actor. He was best known latterly for TV and film work.

Born in Tatabánya, 60 km from Budapest, Éles was orphaned during World War II, and emigrated to Britain during the Hungarian Revolution of 1956. He began his acting career on stage, and went on to appear in a host of television roles, the majority on ITV. These included the ITC series Danger Man, The Baron, The Saint, Timeslip and Jason King.

He appeared as a storyteller on the BBC children's programme Jackanory in ten episodes between 1970 and 1972, and he also made appearances in The Avengers, The Professionals, Strange Report and Upstairs, Downstairs. Often cast in generic 'foreigner' roles (diplomats, waiters, desk clerks), he most often played Frenchmen. Éles became a British citizen on 10 January 1977.

One of his most memorable film roles was as the mysterious Paul in the Brian Clemens thriller And Soon the Darkness (1970).  He also had major roles in the Hammer Horror movies Countess Dracula (1971) and The Evil of Frankenstein (1964) as well as appearing for four years in the 1980s as the scheming restaurant manager, Paul Ross, in the British TV soap opera Crossroads.

In 1996, Éles returned to his cultural roots, appearing as the narrator in the Bartók opera, Bluebeard's Castle. The concert performances, given by the Berlin Philharmonic Orchestra under Bernard Haitink, were recorded for CD.

Éles died in Kilburn, London on 10 September 2002, aged 66, apparently from a heart attack.

Filmography

References

External links
 
 

1936 births
2002 deaths
British male film actors
British male television actors
British male stage actors
Hungarian male film actors
Hungarian emigrants to England
Male actors from Budapest
Naturalised citizens of the United Kingdom